Piombino may refer to the following places in Italy:

Piombino, in the province of Livorno
Piombino Dese, in the province of Padova
Principality of Piombino, an independent state in Italy in 1399-1805